Samkani, also spelled Chamkani or chamkani, is the main town of samkani District in Paktia Province, Afghanistan.

The Chamkani tribe of the Pashtuns is settled in the area around the town.

Climate
Tsamkani has a humid continental climate (Köppen: Dfa), bordering on a monsoonal humid continental climate (Dwa) with hot summers and cold, snowy winters. Precipitation is very high most of the year.

See also
 Khost
 Loya Paktia

References

Populated places in Paktia Province